The Austin Pioneers were a minor league baseball team based in Austin, Texas from 1947 to 1955. The Pioneers were founding members of the Class B level Big State League, qualifying for the playoffs in five seasons and hosting home games at Disch Field.

The Pioneers were preceded by the 1915 Austin Representatives and succeeded by the 1956 Austin Senators.

History
Preceded in Austin by the Austin Senators, the Austin Pioneers were founded, owned and operated by Edmund P. Knebel, a local bottler of 7-Up and Nu-Grape soft drinks. Knebel had Disch Field constructed for the Pioneers. Knebel sold the team after the 1955 season, when the franchise moved to the Texas League and renamed the Austin Senators.

The Pioneers began play in the Big State League in 1947, joining the Gainesville Owls, Greenville Majors, Paris Red Peppers, Sherman–Denison Twins, Texarkana Bears, Waco Dons and Wichita Falls Spudders as charter members.

The Pioneers never finished higher than 3rd place in the Big State League standings during their nine seasons of play in the league. Austin qualified for the playoffs in five Big State League seasons and advanced to the Finals in 1952.

Minor league baseball began in Austin with the 1888 Austin Senators. The Pioneers were preceded in minor league play by the 1915 Austin Representatives and succeeded by the 1956 Austin Senators.

The ballpark
The Austin Pioneers played minor league home games at Disch Field. Located next to the Colorado River, the ballpark was built for the beginning of the 1947 season, financed by Pioneers' owner Edmund Knebel. Named after collegiate coach Billy Disch, the original ballpark was demolished in 1975. Today, UFCU Disch–Falk Field is a collegiate field, located on the campus of the University of Texas at Austin.

Timeline

Year–by–year record

Notable alumni

John André (1952)
Beau Bell  (1947, MGR) MLB All-Star
Fred Campbell (1949)
Aubrey Davis (1947)
George Estock (1947–1949)
Ángel Fleitas (1952)
Sam Harshany (1947)
George Hausmann (1954–1955, MGR)
Tex Hughson (1948) 3x MLB All-Star; Boston Red Sox Hall of Fame
Tom Jordan (1951–1952, MGR)
Tom Kirk (1953)
Al LaMacchia (1952–1953)
Al Monchak (1948)
Prince Oana (1948–1950, MGR)
Al Unser (1953, MGR)

See also
Austin Pioneers players

References

External links
Baseball Reference

Defunct baseball teams in Texas
Baseball teams established in 1947
Baseball teams disestablished in 1955
1947 establishments in Texas
1955 disestablishments in Texas
Baseball teams in Austin, Texas
Defunct minor league baseball teams
Defunct Big State League teams